Axios Systems is a provider of Service Desk, IT Service Management and IT Asset Management software. The assyst enterprise application suite was the first to support ITIL best practices.

The company has a customer base from the Fortune 50, Fortune 500 and Fortune 1000 lists. Worldwide, Axios Systems has more than 1,000 customers and typically targets organisations with at least 1,000 IT users.

Axios Systems was acquired by IFS AB in March 2021.

Locations
Axios Systems is a multinational firm with offices and operations in North America, Europe, Asia, Australia, South America, Central America and the Middle East. The corporate headquarters are in Edinburgh, United Kingdom, with North American headquarters located outside of Washington, D.C., in Herndon, Virginia.

From 2003, Axios Systems expanded into Europe, opening additional offices in Amsterdam, Munich, Moscow, the United Arab Emirates and Malaysia.

Tasos Symeonides and Ailsa Symeonides founded the company in 1988.

Tasos, who was born in Cyprus and migrated to Glasgow as a child, reportedly got the idea of launching Axios Systems while walking in a park and considering how he would pay the mortgage on his newly purchased home in the Eskbank area of Edinburgh. In the company's beginning, 16 employees worked from the Symeonides residence. The Scottish retail group John Menzies, which had previously employed Tasos as their computer systems manager, became Axios Systems' first customer. The business continued to be operated from within the family's attic and bedrooms until 1995, when the company moved to Walker Street, near Haymarket, Edinburgh, and later to nearby Melville Street.

Industry consultant Targeting Innovation, in partnership with Scottish Enterprise, named Axios Systems the 'Scottish software company of the year' in 2004. Since then, Axios has also become the first organization to achieve BS15000 (now ISO 20000) certification. In 2013, Axios became  the first service management vendor to introduce gamification. In 2016, assyst then achieved accreditation for 16 PinkVERIFY™ ITIL processes, the first service management vendor to do so.

Customers
Customers include FedEx Express, Mohawk, The Scottish Government, Magellan Health Services, Synergy Health, Gulf News, Home Properties, Dubai Petroleum, QatarEnergy and Corrs Chambers Westgarth, among others.

Other key customers include toy manufacturer Lego, Associated British Foods and global law firm Linklaters. Lego implemented Axios Systems' service management solution, assyst, in 2002. Associated British Foods announced plans to work with Axios Systems for shared services across 14 divisions of its business in 2009. Linklaters became a customer in 2013, announcing plans to use assyst across its IT, HR and Facilities divisions.

Certifications, governance and compliancy 
 ISO/IEC 20000 (formerly BS 15000)
 ISM certification
 ITIL 2011 (15 processes)
 Microsoft Software Asset Management Competency

See also 
 IT Service Management
 IT Asset Management
 Help Desk
 ITIL

References 

ITIL
Software companies of the United Kingdom
1988 establishments in the United Kingdom
Software companies established in 1988
Companies based in Edinburgh
Companies established in 1988